Alfred Matt (born 11 May 1948) is an Austrian former alpine skier and Olympic medalist. He received a bronze medal in the slalom at the 1968 Winter Olympics in Grenoble. He also competed at the 1972 Winter Olympics.

References

External links
 

1948 births
Living people
Olympic alpine skiers of Austria
Austrian male alpine skiers
Alpine skiers at the 1968 Winter Olympics
Alpine skiers at the 1972 Winter Olympics
Olympic bronze medalists for Austria
Olympic medalists in alpine skiing
FIS Alpine Ski World Cup champions
Medalists at the 1968 Winter Olympics
20th-century Austrian people
21st-century Austrian people